Ron Jones is a former tight end in the National Football League (NFL).

Biography
Jones was born Ronald Gene Jones on July 17, 1947 in Dallas, Texas.

Career
Jones was drafted by the Green Bay Packers in the sixth round of the 1969 NFL Draft and played that season with the team. He played at the collegiate level at the University of Texas at El Paso.

See also
List of Green Bay Packers players

References

1947 births
Living people
Green Bay Packers players
Players of American football from Dallas
American football tight ends
UTEP Miners football players